Đuro Dukanović (22 April 1902 – 1 April 1945) was a Yugoslav cyclist. He competed in two events at the 1924 Summer Olympics.

References

External links
 

1902 births
1945 deaths
Yugoslav male cyclists
Olympic cyclists of Yugoslavia
Cyclists at the 1924 Summer Olympics
Place of birth missing
People from Zagreb County